Emil & the Heartland Express (formerly known as Emil & the Warmlanders) is a Swedish heartland rock/revival rock group, consisting of ordinary rock band set plus a brass section and a violin. The band formed in Arvika, Sweden, where the members met at Musikhögskolan Ingesund. The leadsinger and songwriter, Emil Karlsson, is strongly influenced by such artists as Bruce Springsteen and Stefan Andersson.

They have, among other acts, played at Get a Gig festival, won the district finales in the Swedish contest Rockkarusellen, ranked number one on the radio list Värmlandstoppen.
The band released their debut album ”Changing Lanes” in spring 2010 in started recording the next album in August the same year.

In 2013 the band released the EP ”Emil & the Warmlanders”, containing the songs When dreams are shattered, Perfection's out of range and Give me a sign.

In 2014 and 2015 the band went out on summer mini tours in southern Sweden, as well as performing at Swedish festival Folk & Rock in Segmon, Värmland and reached the regional finals in the radio contest Svensktoppen Nästa.

Between 2015 and 2020 the band took a break, but reemerged in the summer of 2020 with a new name - Emil & the Heartland Express - and released their second album, ”Burning hearts”, while performing the whole album live at Carson City, Berga.

From 2019 and forward, Emil has sworn to release a new Christmas single every year, starting with ”December nights” and ”I’ll be coming home (for Christmas eve)” in 2020.

Members
 Emil Karlsson - lead vocals, guitar, harmonica (2007-present)
 Erica Karlsson - trumpet (2007-present)
 Therese Hållén - violin (2007-present)
 Fredrik Nordh - bass guitar (2007-present)
 Robin East - piano, keys (2007-present)
 Jesper Götlind - tenor saxophone (solo saxophone) (2008-present)
 Rebecka Josefsson - vocals (2009-present)
 Ulf Moström - guitars, vocals (2010-present)
 Rasmus Andersson - drums (formerly organs) (2010-present)
 Robert Häggstam - alto saxophone, clarinet, flute (2010-present)

Until 2014, drums were performed by Johan Ahl and from 2010 to 2014 Rasmus played organs, but later replaced Johan as drummer of the band. The alto saxophone was first performed by Pär Kunze (2007-2009), then by Linus Lösegård (2009-2010), Anna-Franciska Reiske (2010) before Robert joined the band. 
When Ulf first joined the band, he played the acoustic guitar, while Fredrik Kelemen (now member of Swedish power metal band ) played the electric guitar.

Discography

Albums

Singles

Sources

http://www.rockkarusellen.se
http://www.sr.se
http://www.heartlandexpressband.com
http://www.warmlanders.com
http://open.spotify.com/album/0gf9uYdit1YXtyrX9Le2OU

External links
Official site

Swedish rock music groups